This list of Mexican engineers is a list of notable people who have been trained in or have practised engineering.

 

Bernardo Quintana Arrioja
León Ávalos y Vez
Juan Francisco Azcárate
Alexander Balankin
Mariano de la Bárcena
Francisco Barnés de Castro
Luis Enrique Bracamontes
Alberto Bustani Adem
Cuauhtémoc Cárdenas
Heberto Castillo
Pedro Celis
Eduardo Chávez (politician)
Francisco Escárcega
Jorge Galvan
Jesús García
Genaro García Luna
Fernando García Roel
José Antonio Garrido Nataren
Guillermo González Camarena
Jorge Gutiérrez Vera
José María Lanz
José Luis Luege Tamargo
Pablo Emilio Madero
Daniel Mastretta
Baltasar Mena Iniesta
Joaquín de Mendizábal y Tamborrel
Concepción Mendizábal Mendoza
Luis E. Miramontes
Rodolfo Neri Vela
Miguel Ángel de Quevedo
Jorge Matute Remus
Antonio Rivas Mercado
Sigfrido Cuen Rodelo
Alfonso Romo
Emilio Rosenblueth
Gerardo Ruiz Mateos
Javier Barros Sierra
Rodolfo Félix Valdés
California Odha Zertuche Díaz 
Heinrich Zoelly

 
Mexican
engineering